Never Too Soon is the debut studio album by Australian electropop duo Boo Seeka, released on 4 August 2017 through Sureshaker Records and Warner Music Australia.

The album debuted and peaked at number eight on the ARIA Albums Chart.

Background
In an interview discussing on the album, band member Sam Croft said: "This album best reflects our recent life experiences, encapsulating all we've encountered over the past two and a half years. Our recording process for the album followed no structure; we recorded vocals in carparks, tour buses and our studios in Sydney. One vocal loop was recorded into an iPhone on stage in a theatre in America. Ultimately every idea and piece of music we had come together in my bedroom studio, we then took it to our producer Ian Pritchett's garage studio and that's where the songs came to life."

Reception
Triple J called the album "a beautifully crafted, worldly-sounding body of work that was recorded across three continents; in carparks, tour buses and their Sydney studios."

Track listing
 "Does This Last" - 3:33
 "Humans" - 3:17
 "Argo Misty" - 3:13
 "Gold Sail" - 3:37
 "Brooklyn" - 3:41
 "Turn Up Your Light" - 3:55
 "Oh My" - 3:16
 "Calling Out" - 3:35
 "Interlude (One Day Pt. 1)" - 1:33
 "You and Me" - 4:01
 "Calm Symphony" - 4:14

Personnel

Musicians
Boo Seeka
 Ben Gumbleton – vocals
 Sam Croft – production

Technical
 Ian Pritchett – production

Charts

References

2017 debut albums
Boo Seeka albums
Warner Music Australia albums